Gheorghe Olteanu (born 21 May 1926) is a Romanian cross-country skier who competed in the 1950s. He finished 22nd in the 50 km event at the 1952 Winter Olympics in Oslo. He was born in Fundata, Brașov County.

External links
Olympic 50 km cross country skiing results: 1948-64
  

1926 births
Possibly living people
Romanian male cross-country skiers
Olympic cross-country skiers of Romania
Cross-country skiers at the 1952 Winter Olympics
People from Brașov County